Brouzet is a French surname. Notable people with the surname include:

Marguerite Brouzet (1855–1891), mistress of Georges Boulanger
Olivier Brouzet (born 1972), French rugby union footballer
Yves Brouzet (1948–2003), French shot putter

French-language surnames